Valle Cannobina is a comune (municipality) in the Province of Verbano-Cusio-Ossola in the Italian region Piedmont, located about  northeast of Turin and about  northeast of Verbania, on the border with Switzerland.

It was established on 1 January 2019 by the merger of the municipalities of Cavaglio-Spoccia, Cursolo-Orasso and Falmenta.

Valle Cannobina borders the following municipalities: Aurano, Brissago (Switzerland), Cannobio, Centovalli (Switzerland), Cossogno, Gurro, Malesco, Miazzina, Re, Trarego Viggiona.

Geography
Valle Cannobina includes the inhabited centers of Cavaglio San Donnino, Crealla, Cursolo, Falmenta, Gurrone, Lunecco (municipal seat), Orasso, Spoccia.

Demographic evolution

References